The Association of Manitoba Municipalities (AMM) is an organization of municipal governments in the province of Manitoba, Canada.  All municipalities in Manitoba are members.

The AMM was founded in 1999, by a merger of the Union of Manitoba Municipalities (UMM) and the Manitoba Association of Urban Municipalities (MAUM).  Its stated purpose is to identify and address "the needs and concerns of its members in order to achieve strong and effective municipal government".

See also
List of micro-regional organizations

References

External links
AMM Website

Organizations established in 1999
Local government organizations
1999 establishments in Manitoba